The Dan Snyder Memorial Award is awarded each year to the player of the Winnipeg Jets who "best embodies perseverance, dedication and hard work without reward or recognition, so that his team and teammates might succeed." The award was created in 2004, when the franchise was located in Atlanta, to commemorate Atlanta Thrashers forward Dan Snyder, who died from injuries sustained in an automobile accident in September 2003. A similar award is awarded in the OHL and is known as the Dan Snyder Memorial Trophy. Sometimes the Jets' award is called the same name.

With the Thrasher's relocation to Winnipeg, Manitoba to become the Winnipeg Jets following the 2010-11 NHL season, there was worry (by both Thrashers' fans and those living in Snyder's hometown) that Snyder would be forgotten. However, Scott Brown, Winnipeg's director of hockey operations/communications, quelled those fears, revealing that "Craig (Heisinger) was in Atlanta and saw all the things they did for Dan Snyder and we are fully prepared and will be honouring everything to do with him. Dan Snyder's friends and family should not worry at all about that." On March 28, 2012 it was announced that the Jets would continue the tradition of the award. The Snyder family was invited to participate in the first ceremony in Winnipeg on the final game of the regular season.

On April 7, 2012, Winnipeg Jets' defenceman Mark Stuart became the first Winnipeg Jet to be given the memorial award.

Winners

References 

|{

Atlanta Thrashers
National Hockey League trophies and awards
History of the Winnipeg Jets